Guanghua Education Group (Simplified Chinese:光华教育集团) is an educational institution that owns and operates foreign program centers such as Cambridge International Examination center, AP education Center, bilingual schools for compulsory education, language training centers, and study abroad service centers. Guanghua Education Group was formerly known as Shanghai Guanghua College. The company was founded in 2008 and is based in Shanghai, China.

The company
As of 2016, there are 9 full-time schools including but not limited to Shanghai Guanghua College, Guanghua Pudong Campus, Guanghua Cambridge Campus, Shanghai Guanghua Bilingual Middle School, Wuxi Foreign Language School, Suzhou Foreign Language School, Yancheng Foreign Language School, and more than 100 international education alliances. Guanghua Education Group has had over 15,000 students all over Mainland China.

Key people
Lu Yuzong was appointed CEO and chairman of Guanghua Education Group starting in 2008. He is also the founder of Dream Community and a member of the CPPCC (Chinese People's Political Consultative Conference) in Yangpu, Shanghai.

References

Education companies of China
Companies based in Shanghai